Deh Rawood is a town in Deh Rawood District in Uruzgan province, Afghanistan. It is located 400 kilometres southwest of Kabul. Since the U.S. invasion of Afghanistan the area has been noted as a remaining Taliban stronghold. The area is rural with mountainous, roadless terrain.

See also
 Uruzgan Province

Populated places in Urozgan Province